This is a list of films produced in Albania during the 2010s.

Films
 Maya  (2010)
 Shqiptari  (2010)
 Agon  (2011)
 Amnistia  (2011)
 Ballkan Pazar  (2011)
 Farmakon  (2012)
 The Ship  (2012)
 Amsterdam Express  (2013)
 Ada  (2013)
 Femrat  (2013)
 Bota  (2014)
 Chromium  (2015)
 Drejt fundit  (2015)
 Pit Stop Mafia  (2016)
 Life Between the Waters  (2017)
 Te thyer/Broken  (2017)
 Distant Angels  (2017)
 You Can Call Me John  (2017)
 The Tunnel/Tuneli  (2017)
 Bunker  (2017)
 Albanian Gangster  (2018)
 A Shelter Among The Clouds  (2018)
 The Forgotten Mountain  (2018)
 The Delegation/Delegacioni  (2018)
  Seder  (2019)
 2 Fingers Honey  (2019)
 Falco, The Movie  (2019)
 Encounter in the Air  (2019)
 Open Door  (2019)
 The Unfinished Portrait  (2019)

References

2010s